The Journal of Irreproducible Results is a magazine of science humor. It was established in Israel in 1955 by virologist Alexander Kohn and physicist Harry J. Lipkin, who wanted a humor magazine about science, for scientists. It contains a mix of jokes, satire of scientific practice, science cartoons, and discussion of funny but real research.

It has passed through several hands and as of 2015 is published in San Mateo, California.

History 
Alexander Kohn and Harry J. Lipkin founded The Journal of Irreproducible Results in 1955 in Ness Ziona, Israel. Kohn remained editor until 1989. Lipkin remained an editor until volume 16, number 1, August 1967, when Kohn became Editor-in-Chief, and Lipkin became one of the associate editors.

Medical researcher George H. Scherr was the publisher from 1964 to 1989, after which JIR was published by Blackwell Scientific Publications. Under Blackwell, James A. Krosschell was editor and publisher starting with volume 35, number 1, 1990, and remained publisher throughout the Blackwell ownership. Marc Abrahams was editor from 1991, to the next-to-last Blackwell issue in 1994, when he left to form the rival Annals of Improbable Research (AIR) and create the Ig Nobel Prize. The final Blackwell issue, volume 39, number 3, was edited by Leslie A. Gaffney.

In 1994, Blackwell returned JIR to George Scherr, who was publisher and editor until 2003, during which time he pursued a number of legal complaints against Abrahams and AIR, even as the journal's publication became erratic.

JIR received attention from American military intelligence when a copy of one of their articles was found among other papers in an abandoned terrorist headquarters in Kabul. The article was a highly unrealistic and farcical explanation of how to build a nuclear weapon that an unwitting Al Qaida member had filed away. Nonetheless, the discovery prompted a short-lived official investigation.

Astronomer Norman Sperling, an assistant editor at Sky & Telescope magazine, became editor and publisher of the journal in 2004, with promises to rejuvenate it.

See also 
 Journal of Polymorphous Perversity

References

External links
 

1955 establishments in Israel
Bimonthly magazines published in the United States
Science and technology magazines published in the United States
Satirical magazines published in the United States
Magazines established in 1955
Magazines published in California
Professional humor
Humor magazines